Daniel Toribio Aquino Antúnez (born 9 June 1965), nicknamed El Toro (bull), is an Argentine former footballer who played as a striker.

He spent the bulk of his professional career in Spain, appearing in 203 Segunda División matches over seven seasons (94 goals) in representation of four teams. His son Daniel was already born there, and played for Spain at youth level.

Club career
Aquino was born in Chajarí, Entre Ríos Province. After starting his career at Club Atlético Banfield he moved to Spain in 1989, joining Real Murcia of the Segunda División and scoring 15 goals in 33 appearances in his first season. In the 1991 winter transfer window he signed for another team in the country, Albacete Balompié, being relatively used as the Castile-La Mancha side retained their recently acquired La Liga status (18 starts).

From 1992 to 1994, Aquino achieved two consecutive Pichichi Trophy awards in the second tier, one of them – with Real Betis – ending in promotion. After a solid top-flight campaign at Rayo Vallecano and a further one and a half at Albacete in division two, he finished his career in 2002 at the age of 37, with stints in the Segunda División B including former club Murcia, where his son Daniel was born in 1990, eventually also becoming a professional footballer.

From 2008 to 2010, Aquino coached Murcia's juniors.

References

External links

Betisweb stats and bio 

1965 births
Living people
People from Federación Department
Argentine people of Spanish descent
Argentine emigrants to Spain
Sportspeople from Entre Ríos Province
Argentine footballers
Spanish footballers
Association football forwards
Argentine Primera División players
Club Atlético Banfield footballers
La Liga players
Segunda División players
Segunda División B players
Tercera División players
Real Murcia players
Albacete Balompié players
CP Mérida footballers
Real Betis players
Rayo Vallecano players
Lorca Deportiva CF footballers
Argentine expatriate footballers
Expatriate footballers in Spain
Argentine expatriate sportspeople in Spain